Solera de Gabaldón is a municipality located in the province of Cuenca, Castile-La Mancha, Spain. , the municipality has a population of 31 inhabitants.

References

Municipalities in the Province of Cuenca